The Mondiale Car Company is a former racing car constructor based in Bangor, County Down, Northern Ireland. Mondiale was highly successful in Formula Ford 1600 and also provided chassis for the Barber Saab Pro Series.
Construction of the Mondiale Formula Ford chassis utilized bronze welded joints, also called braze welded, a fabrication method where the base metal is heated but not melted and the fillet material is bronze. This method allows joints under extreme stress to act more ductile without tearing the base metal. Bronze welded joints can be heated, separated, and repaired. This welding technique can be readily found in custom bicycle fabrication. Two keys to the success of this welding method are proper component fitment and cleanliness of the tubing joints.

History
The Mondiale Car Company was founded in 1984 by former Crosslé designer Leslie Drysdale and Irish Formula Ford 1600 team owners Dennis McGall and Colin Lees. Their Formula Ford cars primarily competed in the Irish and British Formula Ford championships. Between 1986 and 1997 Mondiale provided the Barber Saab Pro Series with 30 identical chassis to race.

Cars

References

British racecar constructors
British companies established in 1984 
Manufacturing companies established in 1984 
Defunct manufacturing companies of Northern Ireland